Vice-Admiral Sir Robert John Le Mesurier McClure  (28 January 1807 – 17 October 1873) was an Irish explorer of Scots descent who explored the Arctic. In 1854 he traversed the Northwest Passage by boat and sledge, and was the first to circumnavigate the Americas.

Early life and career
McClure was born in Wexford in the south-east of Ireland. His father was Captain Robert McClure from County Londonderry in Ulster, who was serving with the 89th Foot. McClure's mother (the daughter of Archdeacon John Elgee) and father had met and married while his father was stationed in Wexford in 1807; but, his father had died by the time of McClure's birth. He was a first cousin of Jane Wilde, the mother of Oscar Wilde, and spent his childhood under the care of his godfather, John Le Mesurier, governor of Alderney, by whom he was educated for the army. It is said that this branch of the McClures, who settled in County Londonderry in the 1650s, during the Plantation of Ulster, were actually MacLeods whose names had been altered.

On his return he obtained his commission as lieutenant, and from 1838 to 1839, served on the Canadian lakes, subsequently attached to the North American and West Indian naval stations where he remained until 1846.

Two years later, in 1848, he joined a search expedition in their attempt to recover Franklin's lost expedition, an ill-fated expedition to traverse the Northwest Passage led by Sir John Franklin that was missing since 1845. McClure served under James Clark Ross as first 's first lieutenant.

Northwest Passage 

The ships sailed south on the Atlantic, navigated through the Strait of Magellan to the Pacific Ocean assisted by the steam-sloop HMS Gorgon. Collinson and McClure became separated and had no further contact for the rest of their respective journeys.

Investigator sailed north through the Pacific and entered the Arctic Ocean by way of Bering Strait, and sailing eastward past Point Barrow, Alaska, to eventually link up with another British expedition from the northwest. Investigator was abandoned to the pack ice in the spring of 1853. McClure and his crew undertook a sledge journey and were rescued when they happened upon a party from  – one of the ships commanded by Sir Edward Belcher, who sailed into the Arctic region from the east. Subsequently, he completed his journey across the Northwest Passage. Resolute itself did not make it out of the Arctic that year; it was abandoned in ice, but later recovered.

Thus, McClure and his crew were the first both to circumnavigate the Americas, and to transit the Northwest Passage – considerable feats at that time. Enterprise returned to Point Barrow in 1850, a fortnight later than Investigator, and found the passage blocked by winter ice. They had to turn back and return the following year; it conducted its own Arctic explorations, but credit for the Northwest Passage already belonged to McClure.

On his return to the United Kingdom, in 1854, McClure was court martialled for the loss of Investigator. This was automatic when a captain lost his ship. Following an honourable acquittal, McClure was knighted and promoted to post-rank, his commission being dated back four years in recognition of his special services. McClure and his crew shared a monetary reward of £10,000 by the British Parliament.

McClure was also honoured by both British and French geographical societies. In 1855, he was elected a member of the American Antiquarian Society.

Later career 
From 1856 to 1861 he served in eastern waters, commanding a division of the Naval Brigade before Canton in 1858, for which he received the Order of the Bath. His latter years were spent in a quiet country life; he attained the rank of rear-admiral in 1867, and became a vice-admiral in 1873. He died later that year.

McClure is buried at Kensal Green Cemetery, London. His epitaph reads: 'Thus We Launch into this Formidable Frozen Sea. Spes Mea in Deo.' McClure Strait was later named after him, as well as the lunar McClure crater in the Mare Fecunditatis, the Sea of Fertility.

References

Bibliography

External links 

 
 
 

19th-century explorers
1807 births
1873 deaths
British explorers
British polar explorers
Burials at Kensal Green Cemetery
Explorers of Canada
Irish Arctic explorers
Members of the American Antiquarian Society
Persons of National Historic Significance (Canada)
Royal Navy vice admirals
Companions of the Order of the Bath
Knights Bachelor